The  Four Heavenly Ministers , also translated as the Four Sovereigns, are four of the highest sky deities of Daoism and subordinate only to the Three Pure Ones. They assist the Three Pure Ones in administering all phenomenon of the universe.

Four Sovereigns 
The Four Heavenly Ministers are:
 the Great Jade Emperor
 the Great Emperor of the North Star (Polaris) in the Purple Forbidden enclosure at the center of Heaven (Tian)
 the Great Heavenly Emperor of the Highest Palace of the Curved Array (Little Dipper)
 the Empress of the Earth

The Great Jade Emperor is the head of all sky deities and presides over the heaven. The Great Emperor of the North Star assists the Jade Emperor in managing the sun, the moon, stars, and the climate of the four seasons. The Great Emperor of the Curved Array/Little Dipper oversees all matters in heaven, earth, and the human world. The Empress of the Earth is in charge of fertility, land, rivers, and mountains. The four heavenly ministers are often worshiped in Daoist temples.

Six Sovereigns 
In some later Daoist accounts, this group is extended to six. The Six Heavenly Ministers include, in addition to the prior four:

 the King Father of the East, also called the Sovereign of the Eastern Florescence
 the Queen Mother of the West, also called the Primordial Lady Golden Mother

Other accounts instead add:
 the Old Man of the South Pole
 the Heavenly Lord of Supreme Oneness and Salvation from Misery, also called the East Pole Emperor of Blue Essence

See also 
 Chinese mythology

Notes

References

External links 
 道教文化资料库
 玉皇大帝 
 道法会元卷之三 
 星座探奇
 神祇列傳-紫微大帝 
 道教之音
 地母
 后土皇地祇－地母元君

 
Chinese gods
Sky and weather gods
Deities in Taoism